Goldstone Lake is a dry lake in the Mojave Desert of San Bernardino County, California,  northeast of Barstow.

Goldstone Lake is on federal lands within the borders of the Fort Irwin Military Reservation, southwest of the Granite Mountains.

See also
 List of lakes in California

References

External links
 Satellite Photo (Google Maps)

Endorheic lakes of California
Lakes of the Mojave Desert
Lakes of San Bernardino County, California
Lakes of California
Lakes of Southern California